The Vanguard School is an independent, co-educational, boarding and day school for students, 6-12 grade, who learn differently and is located in Lake Wales, FL.  
It is accredited through FCIS and SACS - AdvancED.

History 
In 1960 Dr. Milton Brutten, an expert in dyslexia, led the way in education for students who learn differently when he partnered with Dr. Henry Evans, and founded The Vanguard School in suburban Philadelphia. The private school was one of the first in the country to identify and serve children with learning disabilities.

Elinor "Ellie" Carnill-Steinhilber (1924-2018) and her husband  William "Bill" Carnill II (d. 1989) and friends founded The Vanguard School in Lake Wales, FL. Carnill-Steinhilber was a first grade teacher. One of her children attended the day program at The Vanguard School in Pennsylvania. Wanting to live in Florida full time, Ellie and Bill moved with their two children to Mt Lake in Lake Wales, Florida in 1958. By 1966, The Vanguard School Residential Program expanded to Lake Wales, Florida with six students at Bon Aire Lodge on Lake Pierce.

From 1968-69 The Vanguard School acquired 75 acres of property on US Highway 27 in Lake Wales, and began the initial construction of the Upper School and other amenities. By 1971, the campus was consolidated to the Highway 27 location where it currently is today.

In 1975, The Vanguard School was accredited by the Florida Council of Independent Schools. The Vanguard School of Lake Wales, Florida was incorporated as an Independent Florida Non-Profit Organization, and was accredited by the Southern Association of Colleges and Schools by 1983.

In 2004, the school sustained a direct hit from three hurricanes within a span of six weeks. From 2006-10, dormitories, classrooms, the dining hall, and administration building were overhauled during campus-wide renovations. That year, the class of 2010 was the largest in the history of Vanguard, with a total of 42 graduating seniors.

A family sued the school for negligence in 2011 and settled out of court two years later. The settlement included a gag order for both the school and the family.

The Vanguard School later built a Performing Arts Center and began a campus-wide beautification project in 2016. Security technology was implemented in 2016 as well.

Methodology 

Vanguard School is a private education facility for children with neurologically based learning differences, including ADHD, ADD, high functioning autism (Asperger's), dyslexia, dyscalculia, and dysgraphia. The Vanguard School is not a therapeutic school. Vanguard provides individualized and differentiated instruction for each student. Differentiation of instruction is accomplished by identifying the performance levels of each student within the construct of curriculum standards for each class.

The premise is all lessons begin at the student’s instructional level and move toward mastery of the standards by utilizing specific teaching strategies that will foster student growth and achievement in relation to the required competencies.

Incoming students are assessed to identify their reading level. Classes are designed to improve reading fluency through decoding skills, and development of automaticity with respect to the sound-symbol relationships. Once students become more fluent readers, the focus shifts to comprehension strategies specifically designed for students with reading disorders.

Language development, technology use, self-management, executive functioning, and social and emotional regulation are supported and addressed as "teachable moments" within The Vanguard School's academic programs. The school also provides assistance with students who struggle with language. There is a Social Skills Communication class available and is taught by a part-time Speech and Language Pathologist.

Boarding 
There are different levels of boarding. Day students live off-campus with their families but commute to the campus for classes. Five-day boarders live on campus during the week but live off-campus during the weekend. Full-time boarding students live on campus seven days a week.

Amenities 
The Vanguard School sits on a 77-acre campus with four dorms, three school buildings, a student center, cafeteria, gym, fitness center, performing arts center, and infirmary with medical staff. There is lake access, private counseling rooms, and a sensory calming room.
 Remodeled Boys' Dormitories
 Upgraded Swimming Pool
 Gymnasium
 Outdoor Basketball Court
 Sand Volleyball Court
 Tennis Courts
 Fitness Center
 Performing Arts Center
 Indoor Theater
 Student Center
 Lake Access for Canoeing and Fishing
 Soccer Field
 Track for Walking/Jogging/Biking

Athletics 
The Vanguard School is a Division 2A School and a member of the Florida High School Athletic Association. They offer a variety of competitive and intramural sports. Athletes are able to participate in state-sanctioned competitions against area private and public schools. Intramural sports offer another structured avenue for the enjoyment of athletics. Games and tournaments are scheduled throughout the year and are open to all residential and day students. Offered sports are:
 Tennis
 Basketball
 Soccer
 Golf
 Swimming
 Track and Field
 Cross Country
 Weightlifting
 Volleyball
 Archery

References

External links 
Official web site
Florida Council of Independent Schools Fact Sheet on Vanguard
The Association of Boarding Schools Fact Sheet for The Vanguard School
International Registry for Accreditation Fact Sheet for The Vanguard School
Vanguard History
http://www.greatschools.org/florida/lake-wales/3326-The-Vanguard-School/

Schools in Polk County, Florida
High schools in Polk County, Florida
Private middle schools in Florida
Private high schools in Florida
Boarding schools in Florida
Buildings and structures in Lake Wales, Florida
Educational institutions established in 1966
1966 establishments in Florida